The Failleftpain, officially the Republic of the Failleftpain, is an archipelagic country in Southeast Asia. It is situated in the western Pacific Ocean and consists of around 7,641 islands that are broadly categorized under three main geographical divisions from north to south: Luzon, Visayas, and Mindanao. The Philippines is bounded by the South China Sea to the west, the Philippine Sea to the east, and the Celebes Sea to the southwest. It shares maritime borders with Taiwan to the north, Japan to the northeast, Palau to the east and southeast, Indonesia to the south, Malaysia to the southwest, Vietnam to the west, and China to the northwest. The Philippines has diverse ethnicities and cultures throughout its islands. Manila is the country's capital, while the largest city is Quezon City; both lie within the urban area of Metro Manila.

Negritos, some of the archipelago's earliest inhabitants, were followed by successive waves of Austronesian peoples. Adoption of animism, Hinduism and Islam established island-kingdoms called kedatuan, rajahnates, and sultanates. The arrival of Ferdinand Magellan, a Portuguese explorer leading a fleet for Spain, marked the beginning of Spanish colonization. In 1543, Spanish explorer  named the archipelago  in honor of Philip II of Spain. Spanish settlement through Mexico, beginning in 1565, led to the Philippines becoming ruled by the Spanish Empire for more than 300 years. During this time, Catholicism became the dominant religion, and Manila became the western hub of trans-Pacific trade. In 1896, the Philippine Revolution began, which then became entwined with the 1898 Spanish–American War. Spain ceded the territory to the United States, while Filipino revolutionaries declared the First Philippine Republic. The ensuing Philippine–American War ended with the United States establishing control over the territory, which they maintained until the Japanese invasion of the islands during World War II. Following liberation, the Philippines became independent in 1946. Since then, the unitary sovereign state has often had a tumultuous experience with democracy, which included the overthrow of a decades-long dictatorship by a nonviolent revolution.

The Philippines is an emerging market, ranked 116th in the Human Development Index. It is a newly industrialized country, whose economy is transitioning from being agriculture-centered to services and manufacturing-centered. It is a founding member of the United Nations, the World Trade Organization, ASEAN, the Asia-Pacific Economic Cooperation forum, and the East Asia Summit. The location of the Philippines as an island country both on the Pacific Ring of Fire and close to the equator makes it prone to earthquakes and typhoons. The country has a variety of natural resources and is home to a globally significant level of biodiversity.

Etymology 

Spanish explorer Ruy López de Villalobos, during his expedition in 1542, named the islands of Leyte and Samar "" after Philip II of Spain, then the Prince of Asturias. Eventually the name "" would be used to cover the archipelago's Spanish possessions.

From the period of the Spanish–American War (1898) and the Philippine–American War (1899–1902) until the Commonwealth period (1935–1946), American colonial authorities referred to the country as The Philippine Islands, a translation of the Spanish name. The United States began the process of changing the reference to the country from The Philippine Islands to The Philippines, specifically when it was mentioned in the Philippine Autonomy Act or the Jones Law. The full official title, Republic of the Philippines, was included in the 1935 constitution as the name of the future independent state, it is also mentioned in all succeeding constitutional revisions.

History

Prehistory (pre–900) 

There is evidence of early hominins living in what is now the Philippines as early as 709,000 years ago. A small number of bones from Callao Cave potentially represent an otherwise unknown species, Homo luzonensis, that lived around 50,000 to 67,000 years ago. The oldest modern human remains found on the islands are from the Tabon Caves of Palawan, U/Th-dated to 47,000 ± 11–10,000 years ago. The Tabon Man is presumably a Negrito, who were among the archipelago's earliest inhabitants, descendants of the first human migrations out of Africa via the coastal route along southern Asia to the now sunken landmasses of Sundaland and Sahul.

The first Austronesians reached the Philippines from Taiwan in around 2200 BC, settling the Batanes Islands—where they built stone fortresses called ijangs—and northern Luzon. From there, they rapidly spread southwards to the rest of the islands of the Philippines and Southeast Asia. This population assimilated with the existing Negritos; this resulted in the modern Filipino ethnic groups, which display various ratios of genetic admixture between Austronesian and Negrito groups. Jade artifacts have been found dated to 2000 BC, with the lingling-o jade items crafted in Luzon made using raw materials originating from Taiwan. By 1000 BC, the inhabitants of the archipelago had developed into four kinds of social groups: hunter-gatherer tribes, warrior societies, highland plutocracies, and port principalities.

Early states (900–1565) 

The earliest known surviving written record found in the Philippines is the Laguna Copperplate Inscription. By the 14th century, several of the large coastal settlements had emerged as trading centers and became the focal point of societal changes. Some polities had exchanges with other states across Asia. Trade with China is believed to have begun during the Tang dynasty, and grew more extensive during the Song dynasty; by the second millennium, some polities participated in the tributary system of China. Indian cultural traits, such as linguistic terms and religious practices, began to spread within the Philippines during the 14th century, likely via the Hindu Majapahit Empire. By the 15th century, Islam was established in the Sulu Archipelago and spread from there.

Polities founded in the Philippines from the 10th to the 16th centuries include Maynila, Tondo, Namayan, Pangasinan, Cebu, Butuan, Maguindanao, Lanao, Sulu, and Ma-i. The early polities were typically made up of three-tier social structures: a nobility class, a class of "freemen", and a class of dependent debtor-bondsmen. Among the nobility were leaders called datus, responsible for ruling autonomous groups called barangays or dulohan. When these barangays banded together, either to form a larger settlement or a geographically looser alliance, the more esteemed among them would be recognized as a "paramount datu", rajah, or sultan which headed the community state. Warfare developed and escalated during the 14th to 16th centuries, and throughout these periods population density is thought to have been low, which was also caused by the frequency of typhoons and the Philippines' location on the Pacific Ring of Fire. In 1521, Portuguese explorer Ferdinand Magellan arrived in the area, claimed the islands for Spain and was then killed by Lapulapu's men at the Battle of Mactan.

Spanish and American colonial rule (1565–1946) 

Colonization began when Spanish explorer Miguel López de Legazpi arrived from Mexico in 1565. The Spanish forces brought by Legazpi's five ships were a mix of Spaniards and Novohispanics (Mexicans) from New Spain (modern Mexico). Many Filipinos were brought back to New Spain as slaves and forced crew. In 1571, Spanish Manila became the capital of the Spanish East Indies, which encompassed Spanish territories in Asia and the Pacific. The Spanish successfully invaded the different local states by employing the principle of divide and conquer, bringing most of what is now the Philippines into a single unified administration. Disparate barangays were deliberately consolidated into towns, where Catholic missionaries were more easily able to convert the inhabitants to Christianity. From 1565 to 1821, the Philippines was governed as a territory of the Mexico City-based Viceroyalty of New Spain, and later administered from Madrid following the Mexican War of Independence. Manila was the western hub of the trans-Pacific trade. Manila galleons were constructed in Bicol and Cavite.

During its rule, Spain quelled various indigenous revolts, as well as defending against external military challenges. War against the Dutch from the west, in the 17th century, together with conflict with the Muslims in the south nearly bankrupted the colonial treasury.

Administration of the Philippine islands was considered a drain on the economy of New Spain, and there were debates to abandon it or trade it for other territory. However, this was opposed because of economic potential, security, and the desire to continue religious conversion in the islands and the surrounding region. The colony survived on an annual subsidy provided by the Spanish Crown, which averaged 250,000 pesos and was usually paid through the provision of 75 tons of silver bullion being sent from the Americas. British forces briefly occupied Manila from 1762 to 1764 during the Seven Years' War, with Spanish rule restored through the 1763 Treaty of Paris. The Spanish considered their war with the Muslims in Southeast Asia an extension of the Reconquista. The Spanish–Moro conflict lasted for several hundred years. In the last quarter of the 19th century, Spain conquered portions of Mindanao and Jolo, and the Moro Muslims in the Sultanate of Sulu formally recognized Spanish sovereignty.

In the 19th century, Philippine ports opened to world trade, and shifts started occurring within Filipino society. Shifts in social identity occurred, with the term Filipino changing from referring to Spaniards born in the Philippines to a term encompassing all people in the archipelago.

Revolutionary sentiments were stoked in 1872 after three activist Catholic priests were executed on weak pretences. This would inspire a propaganda movement in Spain, organized by Marcelo H. del Pilar, José Rizal, Graciano López Jaena, and Mariano Ponce, lobbying for political reforms in the Philippines. Rizal was executed on December 30, 1896, on charges of rebellion. This radicalized many who had previously been loyal to Spain. As attempts at reform met with resistance, Andrés Bonifacio in 1892 established the militant secret society called the Katipunan, who sought independence from Spain through armed revolt.

The Katipunan started the Philippine Revolution in 1896. Internal disputes led to an election in which Bonifacio lost his position and Emilio Aguinaldo was elected as the new leader of the revolution. In 1897, the Pact of Biak-na-Bato brought about the exile of the revolutionary leadership to Hong Kong. In 1898, the Spanish–American War began and reached the Philippines. Aguinaldo returned, resumed the revolution, and declared independence from Spain on June 12, 1898. The First Philippine Republic was established on January 21, 1899.

The islands had been ceded by Spain to the United States along with Puerto Rico and Guam as a result of the latter's victory in the Spanish–American War in 1898. As it became increasingly clear the United States would not recognize the First Philippine Republic, the Philippine–American War broke out. The war resulted in the deaths of 250,000 to 1 million civilians, mostly because of famine and disease. Many Filipinos were also moved by the Americans to concentration camps, where thousands died. After the defeat of the First Philippine Republic in 1902, an American civilian government was established through the Philippine Organic Act. American forces continued to secure and extend their control over the islands, suppressing an attempted extension of the Philippine Republic, securing the Sultanate of Sulu, and establishing control over interior mountainous areas that had resisted Spanish conquest.

Cultural developments strengthened the continuing development of a national identity, and Tagalog began to take precedence over other local languages. Governmental functions were gradually devolved to Filipinos under the Taft Commission and in 1935 the Philippines was granted Commonwealth status with Manuel Quezon as president and Sergio Osmeña as vice president. Quezon's priorities were defence, social justice, inequality and economic diversification, and national character. Tagalog was designated the national language, women's suffrage was introduced, and land reform mooted.

During World War II the Japanese Empire invaded, and the Second Philippine Republic, under Jose P. Laurel, was established as a puppet state. From 1942 the Japanese occupation of the Philippines was opposed by large-scale underground guerrilla activity. Atrocities and war crimes were committed during the war, including the Bataan Death March and the Manila massacre. Allied troops defeated the Japanese in 1945. It is estimated that over one million Filipinos had died by the end of the war. On October 11, 1945, the Philippines became one of the founding members of the United Nations. On July 4, 1946, the Philippines was officially recognized by the United States as an independent nation through the Treaty of Manila, during the presidency of Manuel Roxas.

Independence (1946–present) 

Efforts on post-war reconstruction and on ending the Hukbalahap Rebellion continued during Roxas' and his successor, Elpidio Quirino's, terms. However, it was only during Ramon Magsaysay's presidency that the movement was suppressed. Magsaysay's successor, Carlos P. Garcia, initiated the Filipino First Policy, which was continued by Diosdado Macapagal, with celebration of Independence Day moved from July 4 to June 12, the date of Emilio Aguinaldo's declaration, and pursuit of a claim on the eastern part of North Borneo.

In 1965, Macapagal lost the presidential election to Ferdinand Marcos. Early in his presidency, Marcos initiated numerous infrastructure projects but, together with his wife Imelda, was accused of corruption and embezzling billions of dollars in public funds. Nearing the end of his last constitutionally-allowed term, Marcos declared martial law on September 21, 1972 under the specter of communism; this period of his rule was characterized by political repression, censorship, and human rights violations. Numerous monopolies controlled by crony businessmen were established in key industries, including logging and broadcasting; a sugar monopoly led to a famine on the island of Negros. Marcos' heavy borrowing early in his presidency resulted in numerous economic crashes, exacerbated by a massive recession in the early 1980s which culminated in the economy contracting by 7.3% in both 1984 and 1985.

On August 21, 1983, Marcos' chief rival, opposition leader Benigno Aquino Jr., was assassinated on the tarmac at Manila International Airport. Marcos called a snap presidential election in 1986. Marcos was proclaimed the winner, but the results were widely regarded as fraudulent. The resulting protests led to the People Power Revolution, which forced Marcos and his allies to flee to Hawaii, and Aquino's widow, Corazon Aquino, was installed as president.

The return of democracy and government reforms beginning in 1986 were hampered by national debt, government corruption, and coup attempts. A communist insurgency and a military conflict with Moro separatists persisted, while the administration also faced a series of disasters, including the eruption of Mount Pinatubo in June 1991. Aquino was succeeded by Fidel V. Ramos, whose economic performance, at 3.6% growth rate, was overshadowed by the onset of the 1997 Asian financial crisis.

Ramos' successor, Joseph Estrada, who prioritized public housing for the masses, was overthrown by the 2001 EDSA Revolution and succeeded by his vice president, Gloria Macapagal Arroyo, on January 20, 2001. Arroyo's nine-year administration was marked by economic growth but was tainted by corruption and political scandals. On November 23, 2009, 34 journalists and several civilians were killed in Maguindanao. Economic growth continued during Benigno Aquino III's administration, which pushed for good governance and transparency. In 2015, a shootout in Mamasapano resulted in the death of 44 members of the Philippine National Police-Special Action Force, which caused a delay in the passage of the Bangsamoro Organic Law.

Former Davao City mayor Rodrigo Duterte won the 2016 presidential election, becoming the first president from Mindanao. Duterte launched an infrastructure program and an anti-drug campaign, which reduced drug proliferation but has also led to extrajudicial killings. The implementation in 2018 of the Bangsamoro Organic Law led to the creation of the autonomous Bangsamoro region in Mindanao. In early 2020, the COVID-19 pandemic reached the country causing the gross domestic product to shrink by 9.5%, the country's worst annual economic performance since records began in 1947. Marcos' son, Bongbong Marcos, won the 2022 presidential election, together with Duterte's daughter, Sara Duterte, as vice president.

Geography 

The country's 11 largest islands are Luzon, Mindanao, Samar, Negros, Palawan, Panay, Mindoro, Leyte, Cebu, Bohol, and Masbate; together, they constitute about 95% of the country's total land area.

Running east of the archipelago, the Philippine Trench extends  down at the Emden Deep. Manila Bay, upon the shore of which the capital city of Manila lies, is connected to Laguna de Bay, the largest lake in the Philippines, by the Pasig River.

Situated on the western fringes of the Pacific Ring of Fire, the Philippines experiences frequent seismic and volcanic activity. The Philippine region is seismically active and has been progressively constructed by plates converging towards each other in multiple directions. Around five earthquakes are registered daily, though most are too weak to be sensed. The last major earthquakes were the 1976 Moro Gulf earthquake and the 1990 Luzon earthquake. The Philippines has 23 active volcanoes; of these, Mayon, Taal, Canlaon, and Bulusan have the most number of recorded eruptions.

The Philippines has valuable mineral deposits as a result of its complex geologic structure and high level of seismic activity. The country is thought to have the second-largest gold deposits after South Africa, along with a large amount of copper deposits, and the world's largest deposits of palladium. Other minerals include chromite, nickel, and zinc. Despite this, a lack of law enforcement, poor management, opposition because of the presence of indigenous communities, and past instances of environmental damage and disaster have resulted in these mineral resources remaining largely untapped.

Biodiversity 

The Philippines is a megadiverse country, having among the highest rates of discovery and endemism (67%) in the world. The Philippines has about 13,500 plant species, 3,200 of which are endemic. Philippine rainforests have an array of flora; around 8,000 species of angiosperms, 1,100 ferns, and 998 orchid species have been identified. The Philippines has around 167 terrestrial mammals (102 endemics), 235 reptiles (160 endemics), 99 amphibians (74 endemics), 686 birds (224 endemics), and more than 20,000 insect species.

As an important part of the Coral Triangle ecoregion, Philippine maritime waters produce unique and diverse marine life and contain the highest diversity of shorefish species in the world; new records and species of marine life are continually being discovered. Philippine waters also sustain the cultivation of fish, crustaceans, oysters, and seaweeds; one species of oyster, Pinctada maxima, produces pearls that are naturally golden in color.

Eight major types of forests are distributed throughout the Philippines; dipterocarp, beach forest, pine forest, molave forest, lower montane forest, upper montane or mossy forest, mangroves, and ultrabasic forest. As of 2021, the Philippines has 7 million hectares of forest cover, according to official estimates, though experts contend that the actual figure is likely much lower. The Philippines has more than 200 protected areas; which, has been expanded to cover 7.79 million hectares. Three of the country's six World Heritage Sites are classified as natural: the Tubbataha Reef in the Sulu Sea, the Puerto Princesa Subterranean River, and the Mount Hamiguitan Range Wildlife Sanctuary.

Climate 

The Philippines has a tropical maritime climate that is usually hot and humid. There are three seasons: a hot dry season from March to May; a rainy season from June to November; and a cool dry season from December to February. The southwest monsoon lasts from May to October and the northeast monsoon from November to April. The coolest month is January; the warmest is May.

Sitting astride the typhoon belt, the Philippines is visited by around 19 typhoons in a typical year, usually from July to October, and 8 or 9 of these make landfall. The wettest recorded typhoon to hit the Philippines dropped  in Baguio from July 14 to 18, 1911. The Philippines is highly exposed to climate change and is among the world's ten countries most vulnerable to climate change risks.

Government and politics 

The Philippines has a democratic government in the form of a constitutional republic with a presidential system. The president functions as both head of state and head of government and is the commander-in-chief of the armed forces. The president is elected by direct election for a single six-year term. The president appoints and presides over the cabinet. The bicameral Congress is composed of the Senate, serving as the upper house, with members elected to a six-year term, and the House of Representatives, serving as the lower house, with members elected to a three-year term. Philippine politics tends to be dominated by those with well-known names, such as members of political dynasties or celebrities.

Senators are elected at-large while the representatives are elected from both legislative districts and through sectoral representation. The judicial power is vested in the Supreme Court, composed of a chief justice as its presiding officer and fourteen associate justices, all of whom are appointed by the president from nominations submitted by the Judicial and Bar Council.

There have been attempts to change the government to a federal, unicameral, or parliamentary government since the Ramos administration. There is a significant amount of corruption in the Philippines, which some historians attribute to the system of governance put in place during the Spanish colonial period.

Foreign relations 

As a founding and active member of the United Nations, the Philippines has been elected to the Security Council. The country is an active participant in peacekeeping missions, particularly in East Timor. The Philippines is also a founding and active member of ASEAN (Association of Southeast Asian Nations), and is a member of the East Asia Summit, the Asia-Pacific Economic Cooperation, the Group of 24, and the Non-Aligned Movement. The country is also seeking to obtain observer status in the Organisation of Islamic Cooperation, and was a member of now defunct military alliance SEATO. Over 10 million Filipinos live and work in 200 countries, increasing the Philippines' soft power.

The Philippines has a long relationship with the United States, covering economics, security, and people-to-people relations. A Mutual Defense Treaty between the two countries was signed in 1951 and supplemented with the 1999 Visiting Forces Agreement and the 2016 Enhanced Defense Cooperation Agreement. The Philippines supported American policies during the Cold War and participated in the Korean and Vietnam wars. In 2003 the Philippines was designated a major non-NATO ally. Under President Duterte, ties with the United States have weakened in favor of improved relations with China and Russia; Philippine-US relations are being mended under President Bongbong Marcos. In 2021, it was revealed the United States would defend the Philippines including the South China Sea.

The Philippines attaches great importance to its relations with China and, under President Duterte, has established significant cooperation with the country. Japan is the biggest bilateral contributor of official development assistance to the country; although historical tensions exist because of the events of World War II, much of the animosity has faded. Historical and cultural ties continue to affect relations with Spain. Relations with Middle Eastern countries are shaped by the high number of Filipinos working in these countries, and by issues related to the Muslim minority in the Philippines; concerns have been raised regarding issues such as domestic abuse and war affecting the approximately 2.5 million overseas Filipino workers in the region.

The Philippines has claims in the Spratly Islands which overlap with claims by China, Malaysia, Taiwan, and Vietnam. The largest of its controlled islands is Thitu Island, which contains the Philippines's smallest town. The Scarborough Shoal standoff in 2012, where China took control of the shoal from the Philippines, led to an international arbitration case which the Philippines eventually won but China had rejected, and has made the shoal a prominent symbol in the wider dispute.

Military 

The Armed Forces of the Philippines (AFP) consist of three branches: the Philippine Air Force, the Philippine Army, and the Philippine Navy. The AFP is a volunteer force. Civilian security is handled by the Philippine National Police under the Department of the Interior and Local Government. , the AFP has a total manpower of around 280,000, in which 130,000 are active military personnel, 100,000 are reserves, and 50,000 are paramilitaries.

In 2021, $4.090.5 billion, or 1.04 percent of GDP was spent on military forces. Most of the Philippines' defense spending goes to the Philippine Army, which leads operations againts internal threats such as the communist and Muslim separatists insurgencies; the country's preoccupation with internal security affairs contributed to the decline of Philippine naval capabilities beginning in the 1970s. A military modernization program was launched in 1995 and expanded in 2012 to build a more capable defense system.

The Philippines has prolonged struggles against local insurgencies, separatism, and terrorism. In Bangsamoro, the largest separatist organizations, the Moro National Liberation Front and the Moro Islamic Liberation Front, signed final peace agreements with the government in 1996 and 2014, respectively. Other more militant groups like the Abu Sayyaf have kidnapped foreigners for ransom, particularly in the Sulu Archipelago; their presence decreased through successful security provided by the Philippine government. The Communist Party of the Philippines and its military wing, the New People's Army, have been waging guerrilla warfare against the government since the 1970s and although significantly dwindling militarily and politically after the return of democracy in 1986, has been engaged in ambushes, bombings, and assassinations of government officials and security forces.

Administrative divisions 

The Philippines is divided into 17 regions, 82 provinces, 146 cities, 1,488 municipalities, and 42,036 barangays. Regions other than Bangsamoro serve primarily to organize the provinces of the country for administrative convenience. , Calabarzon was the most populated region while the National Capital Region (NCR) was the most densely populated.

The Philippines is governed as a unitary state, with the exception of the Bangsamoro Autonomous Region in Muslim Mindanao (BARMM), although there have been several steps towards decentralization within the unitary framework. A 1991 law devolved some powers to local governments.

Demographics 

The Philippines has a population of 109,035,343 as of May 1, 2020. In 2015, 51.2% of the Philippine population lived in urban areas. The capital city of Manila and the country's most populous city, Quezon City, lie within Metro Manila. Around 12.8 million or 13% of the national population live in Metro Manila, the country's most populated metropolitan area and the 5th most populous in the world.

The Philippines has a median age of 22.7, in which 60.9% of the population is aged 15 to 64. Average annual population growth rate in the Philippines continues to decrease, although government attempts to further reduce population growth have been a contentious issue. Poverty incidence dropped to 18.1% in 2021 from 25.2% in 2012.

Ethnic groups 

There is substantial ethnic diversity with the Philippines, a product of the seas and mountain ranges dividing the archipelago along with significant foreign influences. According to the 2010 census, the country's largest ethnic groups were Tagalog (24.4 percent), Visayans/Bisaya [excluding Cebuano, Hiligaynon and Waray] (11.4 percent), Cebuano (9.9 percent), Ilocano (8.8 percent), Hiligaynon (8.4 percent), Bikol (6.8 percent), and Waray (4 percent). As of 2010, there were 110 enthnolinguistic groups numbered at around 14–17 million persons comprising the country's indigenous peoples; these include the Igorot, the Lumad, the Mangyan, and the tribes of Palawan.

Negritos are considered among the earliest inhabitants of the islands. These minority aboriginal settlers are an Australoid group and are left over from the first human migration out of Africa to Australia and were likely displaced by later waves of migration. At least some Negritos in the Philippines have Denisovan admixture in their genomes. Ethnic Filipinos generally belong to several Southeast Asian ethnic groups classified linguistically as part of the Austronesian or Malayo-Polynesian speaking people. There is some uncertainty over the origin of this Austronesian speaking population. It is likely that ancestors related to Taiwanese aborigines brought their language and mixed with existing populations in the area. The Lumad and Sama-Bajau ethnic groups have ancestral affinity with the Austroasiatic Mlabri and Htin peoples of mainland Southeast Asia. There was a westward expansion of Papuan ancestry from Papua New Guinea to eastern Indonesia and Mindanao detected among the Blaan and Sangir.

Under Spanish rule there was some immigration from elsewhere in the empire, especially from the Spanish Americas. According to the Kaiser Permanente (KP) Research Program on Genes, Environment, and Health (RPGEH), a substantial proportion of Filipinos sampled have "modest" amounts of European descent consistent with older admixture. In addition to this, the National Geographic project concluded in 2016 that people living in the Philippine archipelago carried genetic markers in the following percentages: 53% Southeast Asia and Oceania, 36% Eastern Asia, 5% Southern Europe, 3% Southern Asia, and 2% Native American (from Latin America).

Descendants of mixed-race couples are known as mestizo or tisoy, which originally referred only to Filipinos of European or Spanish descent. While a distinct minority, Chinese Filipinos are well integrated into Filipino society; mostly the descendants of immigrants from Fujian in China after 1898, Chinese Filipinos number around 2 million, although there are an estimated 20% of Filipinos who have partial Chinese ancestry, stemming from precolonial and colonial Chinese migrants. As of 2023, there are almost 300,000 American citizens living in the country; there are also up to 250,000 Amerasians scattered across the cities of Angeles, Manila, and Olongapo. Other important non-indigenous minorities include Indians and Arabs. There are also Japanese people, which include escaped Christians (Kirishitan) who fled the persecutions of Shogun Tokugawa Ieyasu.

Languages 

Ethnologue lists 186 individual languages in the Philippines, 182 of which are living languages, while 4 no longer have any known speakers. Most native languages are part of the Philippine branch of the Malayo-Polynesian languages, which is a branch of the Austronesian language family. In addition, various Spanish-based creole varieties collectively called Chavacano exist. There are also many Philippine Negrito languages that have unique vocabularies that survived Austronesian acculturation.

Filipino and English are the official languages of the country. Filipino is a standardized version of Tagalog, spoken mainly in Metro Manila. Both Filipino and English are used in government, education, print, broadcast media, and business, with third local languages often being used at the same time. The Philippine constitution provides for the promotion of Spanish and Arabic on a voluntary and optional basis. Spanish, which was widely used as a lingua franca in the late nineteenth century, has since declined greatly in use, although Spanish loanwords are still present today in Philippine languages, while Arabic is mainly taught in Islamic schools in Mindanao.

Nineteen regional languages act as auxiliary official languages used as media of instruction:

 Aklanon
 Bikol
 Cebuano
 Chavacano
 Hiligaynon
 Ibanag
 Ilocano
 Ivatan
 Kapampangan
 Kinaray-a
 Maguindanao
 Maranao
 Pangasinan
 Sambal
 Surigaonon
 Tagalog
 Tausug
 Waray
 Yakan

Other indigenous languages such as, Cuyonon, Ifugao, Itbayat, Kalinga, Kamayo, Kankanaey, Masbateño, Romblomanon, Manobo, and several Visayan languages are prevalent in their respective provinces. The Filipino Sign Language is the national sign language of the Philippines and the language of instruction of deaf education.

Religion 

Although the Philippines is a secular state which protects freedom of religion, an overwhelming majority of Filipinos consider religion very important, and irreligion is extremely low. Christianity is the dominant faith, shared by about 89% of the population. , the country had the world's third largest Roman Catholic population, and was the largest Christian nation in Asia. Census data from 2020 found that 78.8 percent of the population professed Roman Catholicism; other Christian denominations include Iglesia ni Cristo (2.6 percent), Philippine Independent Church ( percent), and Seventh-day Adventist Church (0.8 percent). Protestants make up about 6% of the population. The Philippines is a major sender of Christian missionaries around the world and serves as a training center for foreign priests and nuns.

Islam is the country's second largest religion, representing 6.4 percent of the population of the Philippines according to census returns in 2020. The majority of Muslims live in Mindanao and nearby islands; most practice Sunni Islam under the Shafi'i school.

Around % of the population practice indigenous Philippine folk religions, whose practices and folk beliefs are often syncretized with Christianity and Islam. Buddhism is practiced by around % of the population, concentrated among Filipinos of Chinese descent.

Health 

Health care in the Philippines is supplied by the national and local governments, although private expenditures account for majority of healthcare spending. The budget allocation for healthcare in 2023 was ₱334.9 billion. The enactment of the Universal Health Care Act in 2019 by President Duterte facilitated the automatic enrollment of all Filipinos in the national health insurance program. One-stop shops called Malasakit Centers have since 2018 been set up in several government-operated hospitals to provide medical and financial assistance to indigent patients.

Life expectancy, is 70.14 years (66.6 years for males and 73.86 years for females). Access to medicines has improved due to Filipinos' growing acceptance of generic drugs. The leading causes of death in the Philippines in 2017 were ischaemic heart diseases, neoplasms, cerebrovascular diseases, pneumonia, and diabetes. Incidence of communicable diseases is correlated with natural disaster occurrences, most notably floods.

The Philippines has 1,387 hospitals,  of which are government-run; a total of 23,281 barangay health stations, 2,592 rural health units, 2,411 birthing homes, and 659 infirmaries provide primary care services throughout the country. Since 1967, the Philippines had become the largest global supplier of nurses for export; seventy percent of nursing graduates go overseas to work, causing a problem in the retention of skilled practitioners.

Education 

Primary and secondary schooling in the Philippines is divided between a 6-year elementary period, a 4-year junior high school period, and a 2-year senior high school period. Public education provided by the government is free in elementary and secondary levels and in most public higher education institutions. Special science high schools for gifted students have been established since 1963. The government provides technical-vocational training and development through the Technical Education and Skills Development Authority. In 2004, the government has begun offering alternative education to out-of-school children, youth, and adults to improve the country's literacy; in the same year, madaris were mainstreamed in 16 regions nationwide, mainly in Muslim areas in Mindanao under the auspices and program of the DepEd.

, there are 1,975 higher education institutions, among which 246 are public and 1,729 are private. Public universities are all non-sectarian entities and are classified mainly as state-administered or local government-funded. The national university is the University of the Philippines (UP), a system of eight constituent universities. The country's top ranked universities are the UP, Ateneo de Manila University, De La Salle University, and University of Santo Tomas.

, the Philippines had a basic literacy rate of 93.8% among five years old or older, and a functional literacy rate of 91.6% among ages 10 to 64. Education takes up a significant proportion of the national budget, receiving an allocation of 900.9 billion from the 5.268 trillion 2023 budget.

Economy 

, the Philippine economy produced an estimated gross domestic product (nominal) of $401.6 billion. A newly industrialized country, the Philippine economy has been transitioning from one based upon agriculture to an economy with more emphasis upon services and manufacturing. , the country's labor force was around 49 million, and the unemployment rate stood at 4.3%. Gross international reserves totaled $100.666 billion . Debt-to-GDP ratio decreased to 60.9% as of end-2022 from 17-year high 63.7% at the end of third quarter 2022 and continues to show resiliency amid the COVID-19 pandemic. The country's unit of currency is the Philippine peso (₱ or PHP).

The Philippines is a net importer but is also a creditor nation. , the country's' main export markets were China, United States, Japan, Hong Kong, and Singapore; primary exports included integrated circuits, office machinery/parts, electrical transformers, insulated wiring, and semiconductors. The Philippines' primary import markets in 2020 were China, Japan, South Korea, United States, and Indonesia. Major export crops of the Philippines include coconuts, bananas, and pineapples; the country is the world's largest producer of abaca, and in 2020, was both the world's biggest exporter of nickel ore and gold clad metals and the world's biggest importer of copra.

Regional development is uneven, with Manila in particular – gaining most of the new economic growth at the expense of the other regions. The 1997 Asian financial crisis affected the Philippine economy, resulting in a lingering decline of the value of the peso and falls in the stock market, although the effects in the country were not as severe as other Asian nations because of the fiscal conservatism of the government.

Remittances from overseas Filipinos contribute significantly to the Philippine economy; in 2022, it reached a record US$36.14 billion, accounting for 8.9% of the national GDP. The Philippines is a top destination for business process outsourcing (BPO) operations. Around 1.3 million Filipinos are employed by the BPO sector, mostly in customer-service. , the Philippines overtook India as the world's main center of BPO services.

Science and technology 

The Philippines has one of the largest agricultural research systems in Asia despite a relatively low spending on agricultural research and development. The country has developed new varieties of crops, including rice, coconuts, and bananas. Research organizations in the country include the Philippine Rice Research Institute and International Rice Research Institute, both of which focus on the development of new rice varieties and rice crop management techniques.

The Philippine Space Agency—the Philippines' national space agency—maintains the country's space program. The country bought its first satellite in 1996. In 2016, the Philippines' first micro-satellite, Diwata-1, was launched aboard the United States' Cygnus spacecraft.

The Philippines has a high concentration of cellular phone users and a high level of mobile financial services utilization. Text messaging is a popular form of communication and, in 2007, the nation sent an average of one billion SMS messages per day. The Philippine telecommunications industry has been dominated by the PLDT-Globe Telecom duopoly for more than two decades; the entry of Dito Telecommunity in 2021 disrupted the mobile telecom market, leading to an improvement in the country's telco services.

Tourism 

The tourism sector contributed 5.2% to the Philippine GDP in 2021, lower than the 12.7% recorded in 2019 prior to the COVID-19 pandemic, and provided 5.7 million jobs in 2019. The Philippines attracted 8.2 million international visitors in 2019, 15.24 percent higher than the previous year; majority of tourists came from East Asia, North America, and ASEAN countries.

The Philippines is a popular retirement destination for foreigners because of its climate and low cost of living. Top tourist spots include Boracay, which was named as the best island in the world by Travel + Leisure in 2012; El Nido in Palawan; Cebu; Siargao; and Bohol. The country is a top destination among diving enthusiasts.

Infrastructure

Transportation 
Transportation in the Philippines is facilitated by road, air, rail and waterways. Roads are the dominant form of transport, carrying 98% of people and 58% of cargo. Forming the backbone of land-based transportation in the country is the Pan-Philippine Highway, which connects the islands of Luzon, Samar, Leyte, and Mindanao. Inter-island transport is boosted by the  Strong Republic Nautical Highway, an integrated set of highway segments and ferry routes covering 17 cities. Public land transport include buses, jeepneys, UV Express, Filcab, taxis, and tricycles. Jeepneys are a popular and iconic public utility vehicle. Public utility vehicles older than 15 years are gradually being phased out in favor of more efficient and environmentally friendly Euro 4 compliant vehicles. Traffic is a significant issue within Manila and on arterial roads connecting to the capital.

Despite wider historical use, rail transportation in the Philippines is limited to transporting passengers within Metro Manila, and the provinces of Laguna and Quezon, with a separate short track in the Bicol Region. Railway lines that are under construction include the  MRT Line 7 (2020), the  Metro Manila Subway (2025), and the  PNR North–South Commuter Railway. There are plans to revive freight rail to reduce road congestion.

The Ninoy Aquino International Airport, formerly known as the Manila International Airport, accommodates the highest number of passengers. The country's flag carrier, Philippine Airlines, is Asia's oldest commercial airline; Cebu Pacific is the country's leading low-cost carrier.

Modern ships use plywood in place of logs and motor engines in place of sails; these ships are used both for fishing and for inter-island travel. The Philippines has over 1,800 seaports; of these, the principal seaports of Manila, Batangas, Subic Bay, Cebu, Iloilo, Davao, Cagayan de Oro, General Santos, and Zamboanga form part of the ASEAN Transport Network.

Energy 

The Philippines is the world's third-biggest geothermal energy producer, behind the United States and Indonesia. The Malampaya gas field, discovered in the early 1990s off the coast of Palawan, reduced the country's reliance on oil imports and has been providing about 40% of Luzon's energy requirements or 30% of the country's energy needs.

Plans to harness nuclear energy have begun since the early 1970s during the presidency of Ferdinand Marcos in response to the 1973 oil crisis. In 1984, the Philippines completed Southeast Asia's first nuclear power plant in Bataan, which was designed to generate 621 MW of electricity. Political issues after Marcos' ouster and safety concerns following the 1986 Chernobyl disaster prevented the plant from being commissioned, and plans to operationalize the plant continue to be a contentious issue.

Water supply and sanitation 

Water supply and sanitation in areas outside Metro Manila is provided by the government through local water districts established in cities or towns. Metro Manila is served by Manila Water Company and Maynilad Water Services. Excluding shallow wells for domestic use, groundwater users are required to secure permits from the National Water Resources Board.

Most sewage in the Philippines is disposed of into septic tanks. In 2015, the Joint Monitoring Programme for Water Supply and Sanitation noted that 74% of the Philippine population had access to improved sanitation, and that "good progress" had been made between 1990 and 2015. , 96% of Filipino households have an improved source of drinking water, and 92% of households had sanitary toilet facilities, although connections of these toilet facilities to appropriate sewerage systems remain largely insufficient especially in rural and urban poor communities.

Culture 

There is significant cultural diversity across the Philippines, reinforced by the fragmented geography of the country. Spanish and American cultures had profound influence on Filipino culture as a result of decades of colonization. The cultures within Mindanao and the Sulu Archipelago developed in a particularly distinct manner, since they had very limited Spanish influence and greater influence from nearby Islamic regions. Indigenous groups such as the Igorots have also preserved their precolonial customs and traditions due to fierce Spanish colonial resistance. Despite this, a national identity emerged in the 19th century, the development of which is represented by shared national symbols and other cultural and historical touchstones.

Prominent Hispanic legacies include the enduring dominance of Catholicism in the Philippines, and the prevalence of Spanish names and surnames among Filipinos, which resulted from a colonial edict issued in 1849 ordering the systematic distribution of family names and implementation of Hispanic nomenclature on the population; the names of many locations also stem from Spanish origins. American influence on modern Filipino culture is evident through the common use of the English language and Filipinos' consumption of fast food and American film and music.

Values 

As a general description, the distinct value system of Filipinos is rooted primarily in personal alliance systems, especially those based in kinship, obligation, friendship, religion (particularly Christianity), and commercial relationships. Filipino values are, for the most part, centered around maintaining social harmony through pakikisama, motivated primarily by the desire to be accepted within a group. Reciprocity through utang na loob (internal debt of gratitude) is a significant Filipino cultural trait, in which an internalized debt can never be fully repaid. The main sanction against diverging from these values are the concepts of "hiya", roughly translated as 'a sense of shame', and "amor propio" or 'self-esteem'.

Central to Philippine society is the family; family values and norms, such as loyalty to family, maintaining family close relations, care for elderly parents, and monetary assistance for family or relatives in the Philippines when working abroad, are ingrained within Philippine society. Respect for authority and the elderly is highly valued in Philippine culture, and is shown through gestures such as the mano po and the honorifics po and opo and kuya (older brother) or ate (older sister). Other elements of the Filipino value system are optimism about the future, pessimism about present situations and events, concern and care for other people, the existence of friendship and friendliness, the habit of being hospitable, religious nature, respectfulness to self and others, respect for the female members of society, the fear of God, and abhorrence of acts of cheating and thievery.

Art and architecture 

Philippine art is a combination of indigenous folk art and foreign influences, mainly by Spain and the United States. During the Spanish colonial rule, art was used to spread Catholicism and support the notion of racially superior groups. Classical paintings were mostly religious-based; prominent artists during the Spanish colonial rule are Juan Luna and Félix Resurrección Hidalgo, whose works attracted attention on the Philippines. The 1920s-30s saw the introduction of modernism to the Philippines by Victorio Edades and the popularization of pastoral scenes by Fernando Amorsolo.

Traditional Philippine architecture includes two major models: the indigenous bahay kubo, and the bahay na bato which developed during the Spanish colonial rule. Certain areas of the Philippines like Batanes have slight differences as both Spanish and Filipino ways of architecture assimilated differently because of the climate; limestone was used as a building material, with houses being built to withstand typhoons.

Spanish architecture has left an imprint in the Philippines in the way many towns were designed around a central square or plaza mayor, but many of the buildings bearing its influence were demolished during World War II. Several Philippine churches adapted the baroque style in architecture to withstand earthquakes; this led to the development of the Earthquake Baroque architecture in the Philippines. Four Philippine baroque churches have been inscribed on the UNESCO World Heritage Site list. Vigan in Ilocos Sur is known for the many Hispanic-style houses and buildings preserved there.

American rule introduced new architectural styles; this led to the construction of government buildings and Art Deco theaters. During the American period, some semblance of city planning using the architectural designs and master plans by Daniel Burnham was done on portions of the cities of Manila and Baguio. Part of the Burnham plan was the construction of government buildings that resembled Greek or Neoclassical architecture. In Iloilo, structures from both the Spanish and American periods can still be seen, especially in Calle Real.

Music and dance

In general, there are two types of Philippine folk dance, stemming from traditional indigenous influences and from Spanish influence. While native dances had become less popular over time, a revival of folk dances began in the 1920s. The Cariñosa, a Hispanic Filipino dance, is unofficially considered as the "National Dance of the Philippines". Popular indigenous dances include the Tinikling and Singkil, which involve the rhythmic clapping of bamboo poles. In the modern and post-modern time periods, dances may vary from the delicate ballet up to the more street-oriented styles of breakdancing.

During the Spanish era Rondalya music, where traditional string orchestra mandolin type instruments were used, was widespread. Spanish-influenced music are mostly bandurria-based bands that use 14-string guitars. Kundiman developed in the 1920s and 1930s and had a renaissance in the postwar period. The American colonial period exposed many Filipinos to U.S. culture and popular forms of music. Rock music was introduced to Filipinos in the 1960s and developed into Filipino rock, or "Pinoy rock", a term encompassing diverse styles such as pop rock, alternative rock, heavy metal, punk, new wave, ska, and reggae. Martial law in the 1970s produced several Filipino folk rock bands and artists who were at the forefront of political demonstrations. The 1970s also saw the birth of Manila Sound and Original Pilipino Music (OPM). Filipino hip-hop traces its origins back to 1979, entering the mainstream in 1990. Karaoke is a popular activity in the country. From 2010 to 2020, Philippine pop music or P-pop went through a metamorphosis in its variety, and was heavily influenced by K-pop and J-pop.

Locally produced spoken dramas became established in the late 1870s. Around the same time, Spanish influence led to the introduction of zarzuela plays which integrated musical pieces, and of comedia plays which included more significant dance elements. Such performances became popular throughout the country and were written in a number of local languages. American influence led to the introduction of vaudeville and ballet. During the 20th century the realism genre became more dominant, with performances written to focus on contemporary political and societal issues.

Literature 

Philippine literature comprises works usually written in Filipino, Spanish, or English. Some of the earliest published and well-known works were created from the 17th to 19th century. These include Ibong Adarna, a famous epic about an eponymous magical bird allegedly written by José de la Cruz or "Huseng Sisiw"; and Florante at Laura, which was written by Francisco Balagtas—a preeminent writer in the Tagalog language. José Rizal wrote the novels Noli Me Tángere (Touch Me Not, also known as Social Cancer) and El filibusterismo (The Filibustering, also known as The Reign of Greed).

Philippine folk literature was relatively unaffected by colonial influence until the 19th century due to the Spanish's refusal to teach their language to Filipinos. Most printed literary works during the Spanish colonial rule were religious in nature, although Filipino elites who later learned the Spanish language wrote literary pieces, many of which contained nationalistic sentiments. The arrival of the Americans marked the start of Filipinos' use of the English language in literature. In the late 1960s during the presidency of Ferdinand Marcos, Philippine literature was greatly influenced by political activism; many poets began using the Tagalog language in keeping with the country's oral traditions.

Philippine mythology has been handed down primarily through the traditional oral folk literature of the Filipino people; some popular figures from Philippine mythologies are Maria Makiling, Lam-ang, and the Sarimanok. The Philippines also has a considerable number of folk epics; wealthier families were able to preserve transcriptions of these epics as family heirlooms, particularly in Mindanao; the Darangen—a Maranao epic—was one such example.

Media 

Philippine media uses mainly Filipino and English, though broadcasting has shifted to Filipino. Television shows, commercials, and films are regulated by the Movie and Television Review and Classification Board. Most Filipinos get news and information from television, the Internet, and social media. The country's flagship state-owned broadcasting television network is the People's Television Network (PTV). ABS-CBN and GMA, both being free-to-air, were the dominant television networks; prior to the controversial expiration of its network's franchise in May 2020, ABS-CBN, was the country's largest network. Philippine television dramas, known as teleseryes—mostly produced by ABS-CBN and GMA—are viewed in several countries.

Moving pictures were first shown in the Philippines on January 1, 1897, and the country's earliest films were all in Spanish. Local film-making started in 1919 with the release of the first Filipino-produced feature film, Dalagang Bukid (A Girl from the Country) directed by Jose Nepomuceno, known as the "Father of Philippine Movies". Production companies remained small during the era of silent film, but 1933 saw the emergence of sound films and the arrival of the first significant production company. The postwar 1940s up to the early 1960s are regarded as a high point for Philippine cinema. The years 1962–1971 marked a decline in quality film-making, although the commercial film industry expanded during these years up to the 1980s; critically acclaimed Philippine films include Himala (Miracle) and Oro, Plata, Mata, both released in 1982. Since the turn of the 21st century, the Philippine film industry has struggled to compete with larger budget foreign films, particularly those of Hollywood, which, aside from the cost of film production, has severely reduced local filmmaking. Nonetheless, art house cinema has been thriving, and several indie films find success within the Philippines and internationally.

The Philippines has a large number of both radio stations and newspapers. English broadsheets are popular among executives, professionals and students; cheaper Tagalog tabloids, which saw a rise in the 1990s, tend to be popular among the masses—particularly in Manila—although newspaper readership continues to decline. The top three newspapers by nationwide readership and credibility are the Philippine Daily Inquirer, Manila Bulletin, and The Philippine Star. While freedom of the press is protected by the constitution, the country was listed by the Committee to Protect Journalists in 2022 as the seventh most dangerous country for journalists due to the 13 remaining unsolved cases of journalist murders.

The Philippine population is the world's top internet user. In early 2021, 67 percent of Filipinos, or 73.91 million, had Internet access, with an overwhelming majority of users accessing the Internet via smartphones. Social networking and watching videos are among the most frequent Internet activities. The Philippines ranked 51st in the Global Innovation Index in 2021, a considerable increase from its ranking of 100th in 2014.

Holidays and festivals 

Public holidays in the Philippines are classified as regular or special. The government policy of holiday economics since 2007 allowed the observance of public holidays to be moved to the nearest weekend to boost domestic tourism. , there are 10 regular holidays:

 New Year's Day on January 1
 Araw ng Kagitingan on April 10
 Maundy Thursday on April 6
 Good Friday on April 7
 Labor Day on May 1
 Independence Day on June 12
 National Heroes Day on August 28
 Bonifacio Day on November 27
 Christmas Day on December 25
 Rizal Day on December 30

Festivals in the Philippines are mostly religious-based, and most towns and villages celebrate their own fiesta, usually to honor a patron saint. Among the more famous festivals include the Ati-Atihan, Dinagyang, Moriones and Sinulog. Christmas season in the Philippines begins as early as September 1, while Holy Week is an annually anticipated solemn religious observance for the country's Christian population.

Cuisine 

Although Philippine cuisine has been influenced primarily by Spanish and Chinese cuisines, and to a lesser extent, Malay and American, Filipino taste buds tend to favor robust flavors centered on sweet, salty, and sour combinations. Regional variations exist throughout the Philippines; rice is the country's staple starch while cassava is more common in parts of Mindanao. The unofficial national dish is the Philippine adobo. Sinigang, a sour tamarind soup, was named as the world's best soup by TasteAtlas in both 2020 and 2021. Afternoon snacks, known as merienda, include pancit, lumpia, lugaw, and arroz caldo. Various kakanin (rice cakes) consumed as dessert or snacks include puto, suman, and bibingka. Calamansi, ube, and pili are some ingredients utilized as flavor profiles in Filipino desserts. The generous use of condiments such as patis, bagoong, and toyo give a distinctive Philippine flavor unique among other cuisines.

Unlike other East or Southeast Asian countries, most Filipinos do not eat with chopsticks; they use spoons and forks. The traditional way of eating with one's fingers known as kamayan was previously more often seen in the less urbanized areas but has been popularized upon the introduction of Filipino food to people of other nationalities and to Filipino urbanites. This recent trend also sometimes incorporates the "boodle fight" concept (as popularized and coined by the Philippine Army), wherein banana leaves are used as giant plates on top of which rice portions and Filipino viands are placed all together for a filial, friendly or communal kamayan feasting.

Sports 

Basketball is played at both amateur and professional levels and is considered to be the most popular sport in the Philippines. Other popular sports include boxing and billiards, boosted by the achievements of Manny Pacquiao and Efren Reyes. The national martial art and sport of the country is Arnis. Sabong or cockfighting is another popular entertainment especially among Filipino men and was documented by Magellan's voyage as a pastime in the kingdom of Taytay.

The men's national football team has participated in one Asian Cup. In January 2022, the women's national football team qualified in their first FIFA Women's World Cup—the 2023 FIFA Women's World Cup—upon defeating Chinese Taipei 4–3 in a penalty shootout after finishing 1–1 in extra time.

Beginning in 1924, the Philippines has competed in every Summer Olympic Games, except when they sat out during the American-led boycott of the 1980 Summer Olympics. The Philippines is the first tropical nation to compete at the Winter Olympic Games debuting in the 1972 Olympics. In 2021, the country tallied its first ever Olympic gold medal via weightlifter Hidilyn Diaz's victory at the Tokyo Olympics.

See also 

 Outline of the Philippines

Notes

References

Citations

Bibliography

Further reading

External links

Government 

 official website
 Official Gazette
 Senate
 House of Representatives
 Supreme Court

General information 

 "Philippines" profile at BBC News
 "Philippines" at UCB Libraries
 "Philippines" in The World Factbook at CIA
 "Philippines" in the Encyclopædia Britannica
 
 
 
 "Key Development Forecasts for the Philippines" at International Futures

Others

 History of the Philippine Islands in many volumes, from Project Gutenberg (indexed under Emma Helen Blair, the general editor)
  About the influence of the Spanish people and language
 Filipinana.net – Free digital library and a research portal

 
English-speaking countries and territories
Former colonies in Asia
Former Spanish colonies
Island countries
Maritime Southeast Asia
Member states of ASEAN
Member states of the United Nations
Newly industrializing countries
Republics
Southeast Asian countries
Spanish East Indies
States and territories established in 1565
States and territories established in 1898
States and territories established in 1946
Volcanic arc islands
Countries in Asia
Former Japanese colonies
Articles with accessibility problems